"Front Back" is a song by American hip hop recording artist T.I., taken from his fourth studio album King (2006). The song was produced by Mannie Fresh, who also shares co-writing credits alongside Pimp C, Bun B, T.I., Ice Cube, The Meters, Freddie Southwell, Eazy-E and Dr. Dre. The song, which features Southern hip hop duo UGK, samples and embodies portions of the duo's 1994 single "Front, Back, Side to Side", from their second album Super Tight. The song was featured in the trailer for the 2006 film ATL, starring T.I..

Music video
The music video, directed by Dr. Teeth, was filmed in Houston, Texas in October 2005.

The video contains cameo appearances by Big Kuntry King, Slim Thug, DJ Drama, Young Dro, Lil Keke, TV Johnny and P$C. DJ Drama can be heard throughout the whole video, while not on the audio version.

Charts

References

2005 singles
Grand Hustle Records singles
T.I. songs
UGK songs
Songs written by Dr. Dre
Songs written by T.I.
Song recordings produced by Mannie Fresh
Atlantic Records singles
Songs written by Ice Cube
Songs written by Mannie Fresh
Songs written by Bun B
Songs written by Pimp C